Apostolepis polylepis, the hawbeack blackhead, is a species of snake in the family Colubridae. It is endemic to Brazil.

References 

polylepis
Reptiles described in 1922
Reptiles of Brazil
Taxa named by Afrânio Pompílio Gastos do Amaral